Maurice Foley may refer to:

Maurice Foley (sportsman) (1930–2013), Australian cricketer and field hockey player
Maurice Foley (politician) (1925–2002), British Labour politician
Maurice B. Foley (born 1960), Chief Judge of the United States Tax Court